Below is the list of populated places in Gümüşhane Province, Turkey by district. In the following lists first place in each list is the administrative center of the district.

Gümüşhane
 Gümüşhane
 Akçahisar, Gümüşhane	
 Akçakale, Gümüşhane	
 Akgedik, Gümüşhane	
 Akhisar, Gümüşhane	
 Akocak, Gümüşhane	
 Akpınar, Gümüşhane	
 Aksu, Gümüşhane	
 Aktutan, Gümüşhane	
 Alçakdere, Gümüşhane	
 Alemdar, Gümüşhane	
 Arduç, Gümüşhane	
 Arslanca, Gümüşhane	
 Arzular, Gümüşhane	
 Aşağı Yuvalı, Gümüşhane	
 Aşağıalıçlı, Gümüşhane	
 Avşarbeyli, Gümüşhane	
 Bahçecik, Gümüşhane	
 Ballıca, Gümüşhane	
 Bandırlık, Gümüşhane	
 Beşoba, Gümüşhane	
 Beyçam, Gümüşhane	
 Boyluca, Gümüşhane	
 Buğalı, Gümüşhane	
 Çalık, Gümüşhane	
 Çaltılı, Gümüşhane	
 Çamlı, Gümüşhane	
 Çayırardı, Gümüşhane	
 Çorak, Gümüşhane	
 Demirkaynak, Gümüşhane	
 Demirören, Gümüşhane	
 Dibekli, Gümüşhane	
 Dölek, Gümüşhane	
 Dörtkonak, Gümüşhane	
 Dumanlı, Gümüşhane	
 Duymadık, Gümüşhane	
 Düğünyazı, Gümüşhane	
 Erdemler, Gümüşhane	
 Esenler, Gümüşhane	
 Esenyurt, Gümüşhane	
 Geçit, Gümüşhane	
 Gökçepınar, Gümüşhane	
 Gökdere, Gümüşhane	
 Gözeler, Gümüşhane	
 Gümüşkaya, Gümüşhane	
 Güngören, Gümüşhane	
 Güvercinlik, Gümüşhane	
 Harmancık, Gümüşhane	
 Hasköy, Gümüşhane	
 İkisu, Gümüşhane	
 İkiz, Gümüşhane	
 İncesu, Gümüşhane	
 Kale, Gümüşhane	
 Kaletaş, Gümüşhane	
 Karamustafa, Gümüşhane	
 Kayabaşı, Gümüşhane	
 Kazantaş, Gümüşhane	
 Keçikaya, Gümüşhane	
 Kılıçören, Gümüşhane	
 Kırıklı, Gümüşane	
 Kızılca, Gümüşhane	
 Kocapınar, Gümüşhane	
 Kocayokuş, Gümüşhane	
 Kurtoğlu, Gümüşhane	
 Mescitli, Gümüşhane	
 Nazlıçayır, Gümüşhane	
 Olucak, Gümüşhane	
 Olukdere, Gümüşhane	
 Örenler, Gümüşhane	
 Övündü, Gümüşhane	
 Pehlivantaşı, Gümüşhane	
 Pirahmet, Gümüşhane	
 Sargınkaya, Gümüşhane	
 Sarıçiçek, Gümüşhane	
 Söğütağıl, Gümüşhane	
 Sungurbeyli, Gümüşhane	
 Süle, Gümüşhane	
 Süngübayır, Gümüşhane	
 Şephane, Gümüşhane	
 Tamzı, Gümüşhane	
 Tandırlık, Gümüşhane	
 Tekke, Gümüşhane	
 Üçkol, Gümüşhane	
 Yağlıdere, Gümüşhane	
 Yağmurdere, Gümüşhane	
 Yaydemir, Gümüşhane	
 Yayladere, Gümüşhane	
 Yenice, Gümüşhane	
 Yeniköy, Gümüşhane	
 Yeniyol, Gümüşhane	
 Yeşildere, Gümüşhane	
 Yeşilyurt, Gümüşhane	
 Yitirmez, Gümüşhane	
 Yukarı Alıçlı, Gümüşhane	
 Yukarı Yuvalı, Gümüşhane

Kelkit
 Kelkit
 Ağıl, Kelkit	
 Ağlık, Kelkit	
 Akdağ, Kelkit	
 Aksöğüt, Kelkit	
 Alacat, Kelkit	
 Aşağıözlüce, Kelkit	
 Aşut, Kelkit	
 Aydoğdu, Kelkit	
 Aziz, Kelkit	
 Babakonağı, Kelkit	
 Balıklı, Kelkit	
 Balkaya, Kelkit	
 Başpınar, Kelkit	
 Belenli, Kelkit	
 Beşdeğirmen, Kelkit	
 Bezendi, Kelkit	
 Bindal, Kelkit	
 Bulak, Kelkit	
 Cemalli, Kelkit	
 Çağlar, Kelkit	
 Çakırlar, Kelkit	
 Çambaşı, Kelkit	
 Çamur, Kelkit	
 Çimenli, Kelkit	
 Çömlecik, Kelkit	
 Dayısı, Kelkit	
 Deliler, Kelkit	
 Deredolu, Kelkit	
 Dereyüzü, Kelkit	
 Devekorusu, Kelkit	
 Doğanca, Kelkit	
 Doğankavak, Kelkit	
 Dölek, Kelkit	
 Elmelik, Kelkit	
 Eskikadı, Kelkit	
 Eskiyol, Kelkit	
 Eymür, Kelkit	
 Gerdekhisar, Kelkit	
 Gödül, Kelkit	
 Güllüce, Kelkit	
 Gültepe, Kelkit	
 Gümüşgöze, Kelkit	
 Günbatur, Kelkit	
 Güneyçevirme, Kelkit	
 Gürleyik, Kelkit	
 Güzyurdu, Kelkit	
 Karacaören, Kelkit	
 Karaçayır, Kelkit	
 Karşıyaka, Kelkit	
 Kaş, Kelkit	
 Kazanpınar, Kelkit	
 Kılıççı, Kelkit	
 Kılıçtaşı, Kelkit	
 Kınalıtaş, Kelkit	
 Kızılca, Kelkit	
 Kozoğlu, Kelkit	
 Kömür, Kelkit	
 Köycük, Kelkit	
 Kuşluk, Kelkit	
 Obalar, Kelkit	
 Oğuz, Kelkit	
 Öbektaş, Kelkit	
 Öğütlü, Kelkit	
 Örenbel, Kelkit	
 Özen, Kelkit	
 Sadak, Kelkit	
 Salördek, Kelkit	
 Sarışeyh, Kelkit	
 Söğütlü, Kelkit	
 Sökmen, Kelkit	
 Sütveren, Kelkit	
 Şen, Kelkit	
 Tütenli, Kelkit	
 Uzunkol, Kelkit	
 Ünlüpınar, Kelkit	
 Yarbaşı, Kelkit	
 Yenice, Kelkit	
 Yeniköy, Kelkit	
 Yeniyol, Kelkit	
 Yeşilova, Kelkit	
 Yeşilyurt, Kelkit	
 Yolçatı, Kelkit	
 Yukarıözlüce, Kelkit

Köse
 Köse
 Akbaba, Köse	
 Altıntaş, Köse	
 Bizgili, Köse	
 Gökçeköy, Köse	
 Kabaktepe, Köse	
 Kayadibi, Köse	
 Oylumdere, Köse	
 Örenşar, Köse	
 Övünce, Köse	
 Özbeyli, Köse	
 Salyazı, Köse	
 Subaşı, Köse	
 Yaylım, Köse	
 Yuvacık, Köse

Kürtün
 Kürtün	
 Akçal, Kürtün	
 Aktaş, Kürtün	
 Araköy, Kürtün	
 Arpacık, Kürtün	
 Aşağıkaradere, Kürtün	
 Bağlama, Kürtün	
 Beşirköy, Kürtün	
 Beytarla, Kürtün	
 Çayırçukur, Kürtün	
 Damlı, Kürtün	
 Demirciler, Kürtün	
 Eğrigüney, Kürtün	
 Ekinciler, Kürtün	
 Elceğiz, Kürtün	
 Elmalı, Kürtün	
 Göndere, Kürtün	
 Gündoğdu, Kürtün	
 Günyüzü, Kürtün	
 Gürgenli, Kürtün	
 Kırgeriş, Kürtün	
 Kızılcatam, Kürtün	
 Kızılot, Kürtün	
 Konacık, Kürtün	
 Kuşluk, Kürtün	
 Özkürtün, Kürtün	
 Sapmaz, Kürtün	
 Sarıbaba, Kürtün	
 Söğüteli, Kürtün	
 Şendere, Kürtün	
 Taşlıca, Kürtün	
 Tilkicek, Kürtün	
 Üçtaş, Kürtün	
 Yaylalı, Kürtün	
 Yeşilköy, Kürtün	
 Yukarıkaradere, Kürtün

Şiran
 Şiran
 Akbulak, Şiran	
 Akçalı, Şiran	
 Aksaray, Şiran	
 Akyayla, Şiran	
 Alacahan, Şiran	
 Alıç, Şiran	
 Araköy, Şiran	
 Ardıçlı, Şiran	
 Arıtaş, Şiran	
 Aşağıduruçay, Şiran	
 Babacan, Şiran	
 Babuş, Şiran	
 Bahçeli, Şiran	
 Balıkhisar, Şiran	
 Başköy, Şiran	
 Belen, Şiran	
 Beydere, Şiran	
 Bilgili, Şiran	
 Boğazyayla, Şiran	
 Bolluk, Şiran	
 Çağıl, Şiran	
 Çakırkaya, Şiran	
 Çalköy, Şiran	
 Çambaşı, Şiran	
 Çanakçı, Şiran	
 Çatmalar, Şiran	
 Çavlan, Şiran	
 Çevrepınar, Şiran	
 Darıbükü, Şiran	
 Dilekyolu, Şiran	
 Dumanoluğu, Şiran	
 Eldiğin, Şiran	
 Elmaçukuru, Şiran	
 Ericek, Şiran	
 Evren, Şiran	
 Gökçeler, Şiran	
 Günbatur, Şiran	
 Günyüzü, Şiran	
 Güreşköy, Şiran	
 İncedere, Şiran	
 İnözü, Şiran	
 Kadıçayırı, Şiran	
 Karaşeyh, Şiran	
 Kavaklıdere, Şiran	
 Kavakpınarı, Şiran	
 Kaynakbaşı, Şiran	
 Kırıntı, Şiran	
 Konaklı, Şiran	
 Koyunbaba, Şiran	
 Kozağaç, Şiran	
 Ozanca, Şiran	
 Örenkale, Şiran	
 Paşapınarı, Şiran	
 Pelirli, Şiran	
 Sadıkköy, Şiran	
 Sarıca, Şiran	
 Selimiye, Şiran	
 Sellidere, Şiran	
 Seydibaba, Şiran	
 Sinanlı, Şiran	
 Söğütalan, Şiran	
 Susuz, Şiran	
 Telme, Şiran	
 Tepedam, Şiran	
 Yedibölük, Şiran	
 Yeniköy, Şiran	
 Yeşilbük, Şiran	
 Yolbilen, Şiran	
 Yukarıduruçay, Şiran	
 Yukarıkulaca, Şiran

Torul
 Torul	
 Aksüt, Torul	
 Alınyayla, Torul	
 Altınpınar, Torul	
 Arılı, Torul	
 Arpalı, Torul	
 Atalar, Torul	
 Bahçelik, Torul	
 Budak, Torul	
 Büyükçit, Torul	
 Cebeli, Torul	
 Dağdibi, Torul	
 Dedeli, Torul	
 Demirkapı, Torul	
 Gülaçar, Torul	
 Gümüştuğ, Torul	
 Günay, Torul	
 Güvemli, Torul	
 Güzeloluk, Torul	
 Harmancık, Torul	
 Herek, Torul	
 Işık, Torul	
 İlecik, Torul	
 İnkılap, Torul	
 Kalecik, Torul	
 Kirazlık, Torul	
 Kocadal, Torul	
 Kopuz, Torul	
 Köstere, Torul	
 Küçükçit, Torul	
 Tokçam, Torul	
 Uğurtaşı, Torul	
 Yalınkavak, Torul	
 Yeşilköy, Torul	
 Yıldız, Torul	
 Yurt, Torul	
 Yücebelen, Torul	
 Zigana, Torul

References

Gumushane
List